Władysław Aleksander Langner (18 June 1896 in Jaworów  28 September 1972) was a Polish general, best known as commander of the Siege of Lwów in 1939.

Early career
Władysław Langner spent his childhood in the Polish town of Tarnów, where he became a member of a local Independent Youth Union, which he represented at a national congress in Kraków in 1913. In the same year he founded a paramilitary organization in Tarnów together with his brother, in which they regularly organized military exercises and training. Later this organization also engaged in recruiting to the Polish National Army.

In the years 1914-1917, he served in the I Brigade of Piłsudski's Polish Legions and became commander of an infantry platoon. In the following years he was commanding officer of, among others, the 5th Infantry Regiment, the 40th Infantry Regiment stationed in Lwów, and the 12th Infantry Division based in Tarnopol. In 1928, Władysław Langner was called to Warsaw, where he worked as Head of the Main Administration Bureau of the Ministry of War. After three years he was promoted to the second Vice Minister of War and Chief of Army Administration, and in 1934 he was promoted to General. Until 1938 he served as a CO of Łódź-based IV Corps Command. Later, until 1939, he served on the same post in the headquarters of the VI Corps Command in Lwów.

World War II
During the Polish Defensive War of September 1939, Władysław Langner assumed command of all the Polish forces stationed in and around the city of Lwów. Although most of the regular Polish forces normally stationed in the area were transported to the front, he managed to organize the defence of both the city and its area. With march battalions, rear troops, marauders and raw recruits, he prepared the city for the fight. He commanded his forces during fights against the Wehrmacht and the Red Army, which later became known as the Battle of Lwów. Although his troops were badly outnumbered, outflanked and under equipped, the defense lasted ten days, after which General Langner surrendered the city to the Red Army so as to, according to his own words, "not endanger further the lives of the people and risk the destruction of the city".

After leaving the city, he managed to escape to Romania, and then to France, where he joined the reborn Polish Army being formed under the auspices of the Polish government in exile. After the fall of France, he retreated to the United Kingdom. There, he was appointed commander of the Polish 3rd Carpathian Rifle Brigade stationed in Scotland. In 1941 he gave up this post and between 1943 and the end of World War II he served as an Inspector of Military Training of Polish Units in Great Britain.

Retirement

In 1945 Władysław Langner retired to a farm near Newcastle upon Tyne, where he died in 1972.

Honours and awards
 Gold Cross of the Virtuti Militari, also the Silver Cross
 Cross of Independence
 Officer's Cross of the Order of Polonia Restituta
 Cross of Valour - four times
 Gold Cross of Merit

1896 births
1972 deaths
People from Yavoriv
Polish generals
Polish military personnel of World War II
Recipients of the Gold Cross of the Virtuti Militari
Recipients of the Cross of Independence
Officers of the Order of Polonia Restituta
Recipients of the Cross of Valour (Poland)
Recipients of the Gold Cross of Merit (Poland)
Polish people of the Polish–Soviet War